Vara (also Romanized as Varā; also known as Gārā, Garra, and Vorrā’) is a village in Howli Rural District, in the Central District of Paveh County, Kermanshah Province, Iran. At the 2006 census, its population was 290, in 80 families.

References 

Populated places in Paveh County